The Utcubamba valley is born in the high jalcas of Chachapoyas and runs from the southeast to the northwest to mix with the waters of the Marañón river, forming the immense plain of Bagua. This plain has a warm climate, with temperatures reaching a maximum of 40 °C and the minimum of 21 °C.

Like in the whole high jungle region of Peru, its water regimen is irregular and sometimes without rains.

Valleys of Peru
Landforms of Amazonas Region

de:See von Pomacochas
lt:Pomakočios lagūna